Finnsæter Chapel is a chapel of the Church of Norway in Senja Municipality in Troms og Finnmark county, Norway.  It is located in the village of Finnsæter.  It is an annex chapel for the Berg parish which is part of the Senja prosti (deanery) in the Diocese of Nord-Hålogaland. The white, wooden chapel was built in a long church style in 1982 using plans drawn up by the architecture company Ric. Bjørn A/S. The chapel seats about 77 people. The chapel was consecrated on 29 August 1982 by the Bishop Arvid Nergård.

See also
List of churches in Nord-Hålogaland

References

Senja
Churches in Troms
Wooden churches in Norway
20th-century Church of Norway church buildings
Churches completed in 1982
1982 establishments in Norway
Long churches in Norway